Platypeza hirticeps is a species of flat-footed flies in the family Platypezidae.

References

Platypezidae
Insects described in 1901
Taxa named by George Henry Verrall